Sebastian Stolze (born 29 January 1995) is a German professional footballer who plays as a striker for Hannover 96.

Club career
During the 2017–18 season, he was loaned out from VfL Wolfsburg. After his loan ended, he signed a three-year-contract with Regensburg.

Stolze joined Hannover 96 ahead of the 2021–22 season.

International career
Stolze was a member of the Germany under-20 team. Previously he also played for the under-19 team, where he was part of the winning squad at the 2014 European Championships.

References

External links
 
 

1995 births
Living people
German footballers
Association football forwards
Germany youth international footballers
FC Rot-Weiß Erfurt players
VfL Wolfsburg II players
SSV Jahn Regensburg players
Hannover 96 players
2. Bundesliga players
3. Liga players
Regionalliga players